
Białobrzegi County is a unit of territorial administration and local government (powiat) in Masovian Voivodeship, east-central Poland. It came into being on January 1, 1999, as a result of the Polish local government reforms passed in 1998.

As of 2019 its total population is 33,524, out of which the population of Białobrzegi is 6,951, that of Wyśmierzyce is 885, and the rural population is 25,688.

Neighbouring counties
Białobrzegi County is bordered by Grójec County to the north, Kozienice County to the east, Radom County to the south and Przysucha County to the south-west.

Administrative division
The county is subdivided into six gminas (two urban-rural and four rural). These are listed in the following table, in descending order of population.

References

 
Land counties of Masovian Voivodeship